John "Mopsy" Rantall (born 9 December 1943) is a former Australian rules footballer who played for the South Melbourne Football Club, North Melbourne Football Club and Fitzroy Football Club in the Victorian Football League (VFL).

A lightly-built defender who consistently held his own against many of the VFL's best forwards, Rantall was an inaugural inductee into the Australian Football Hall of Fame in 1996. He is a member of both the North Melbourne and Swans Team of the Century.

Playing career
Originally from Cobden, Rantall moved to the South Melbourne Football Club, where he debuted in 1963.
He quickly became recognised as one of the VFL's most dependable and consistent defenders, and when South Melbourne's champion rover and captain Bob Skilton tore an achilles tendon before the 1969 VFL season, Rantall stood in as acting captain, eventually taking over as official captain after Skilton retired in 1971.
In 1973, he moved to North Melbourne Football Club under the VFL's short-lived "10-year rule", which allowed players with ten years' service at one club to move to another club without a clearance, with the intention of playing in a premiership side. He got his wish, winning in 1975; and, then, moving back to South Melbourne for 1976. A reliable defender who worked tirelessly to repel opposition attacks, Rantall had magnificent skills.

Sadly, Rantall's career at South Melbourne came to a bitter end, despite being the club's games record holder.

He moved to Fitzroy for one last season in 1980, where he played 6 games and broke Kevin Murray's VFL games record.

Life after Playing
After the South Melbourne Football Club relocated to Sydney, Rantall became a much-loved and respected football pioneer in Queensland and New South Wales, which included a coaching stint in Brisbane, time on the board of AFL North Coast (NSW), and a junior coaching role with the Swans Academy in that region.

In 1996, he was inducted into the Australian Football Hall of Fame.

In January 2014, Rantall moved back to country Victoria, wanting to be close to his two brothers. He settled in Noorat, about 30 kilometres from his hometown, Cobden.

Footnotes

References
 Final Training Lists for V.F.L.: South Melbourne, The Age, (Monday, 15 April 1963), p.14.
 Three Recruits Likely For South Side, The Age, (Monday, 15 April 1963), p.14.
 W.A. Players in Cats' Ruck, The Age, (Friday, 19 April 1963), p.26.
 League Teams Chosen: Geelong v. South Melbourne, The Age, (Friday, 19 April 1963), p.26.

External links

 John Rantall: Boyles Football Photos.
 AFL Hall of Fame - Players
 Interview with Mike Sheahan

North Melbourne Football Club players
North Melbourne Football Club Premiership players
Sydney Swans players
Fitzroy Football Club players
Australian Football Hall of Fame inductees
Syd Barker Medal winners
Australian rules footballers from Victoria (Australia)
Cobden Football Club players
1943 births
Living people
One-time VFL/AFL Premiership players